Sarat Chandra Chattopadhyay Medical College and Hospital (SCCGMCH), established in 2022, is a  full-fledged tertiary referral Government medical college and hospital. This college is located at the Uluberia city in Howrah district, West Bengal. This college imparts the degree Bachelor of Medicine and Surgery (MBBS) and associated degrees. This college also offers the Nursing and para-medical courses. The hospital associated with the college is one of the largest hospitals in the Howrah district.

Courses
Sarat Chandra Chattopadhyay Medical College and Hospital undertakes education and training of 100 students in MBBS courses.

Affiliated
The college is affiliated to the West Bengal University of Health Sciences and is recognised by the National Medical Commission.

References

Medical colleges in West Bengal
Affiliates of West Bengal University of Health Sciences
Universities and colleges in Howrah district
Educational institutions established in 2022